Below are the rosters for teams competing in the 2004 World Junior Ice Hockey Championships.

Group A

Head coach:  Mike Eaves

Head coach:  Jozef Frühauf and  Robert Spišák

Head coach:  Rafail Ishmatov

Head coach:  Torgny Bendelin

Head coach:  Herbert Pöck

Group B

Head coach:  Mario Durocher

Head coach:  Hannu Aravirta

Head coach:  Alois Hadamczik

Head coach:  Jakob Kölliker

Head coach:  Serhiy Lubnin

References

Archived version of official site with links to stats leaders and award winners

Rosters
World Junior Ice Hockey Championships rosters